Michael John Cvengros (December 1, 1900 – August 2, 1970) was a Major League Baseball pitcher. He played all or part of six seasons in the majors, between 1922 and 1929, for the New York Giants, Chicago White Sox, Pittsburgh Pirates, and Chicago Cubs. After his major league career, he played in the minor leagues until 1937, mostly for the Houston Buffaloes. In that final season, he served part of the year as the Buffaloes' manager.

External links

Major League Baseball pitchers
New York Giants (NL) players
Chicago White Sox players
Pittsburgh Pirates players
Chicago Cubs players
Chickasha Chicks players
Little Rock Travelers players
New Orleans Pelicans (baseball) players
Wichita Falls Spudders players
Indianapolis Indians players
Columbus Red Birds players
Houston Buffaloes managers
Houston Buffaloes players
Abbeville A's players
Baseball players from Illinois
1900 births
1970 deaths
People from Pana, Illinois